The 2013 Philadelphia Cycling Classic was a one-day women's cycle race, held in the United States on June 2 2013. The tour has an UCI rating of 1.2.

References

2013 in women's road cycling
2013 in American sports
2013 in sports in Pennsylvania
Philadelphia Cycling Classic